Lion's Den or Lions' Den may refer to:

Media

Literature
 The biblical episode of Daniel in the lions' den
 The Lion's Den, a 2009 World Fantasy Award-nominated novella by Steven Duffy
 The Lions' Den, a 2019 book by Susie Linfield

Movies
 The Lion's Den (1919 film), a 1919 American film starring Bert Lytell
 The Lion's Den (1936 film), a 1936 American western film starring Tim McCoy 
 Lion's Den (1988 film), a 1988 short film by Bryan Singer
 Lion's Den (2008 film), a 2008 Argentine film by Pablo Trapero

Music
 "Lion's Den", a song on the Morbid Angel album, Covenant
 "Lion's Den", a song on the Bruce Springsteen album Tracks

Television
 "Lion's Den" (The Outer Limits),  an episode of the seventh season of The Outer Limits
 The Lyon's Den, a short-lived TV show starring Rob Lowe

Places
 Lion's Den, Zimbabwe, a village in the province of Mashonaland West, Zimbabwe
 Lion's Den (nightclub), a club in Greenwich Village, New York City

Other
Lions' Den (militant group), a Palestinian militia group operating in the West Bank
 Lion's Den (mixed martial arts), the name of a mixed martial arts fighting team
 Lion's Den Match, a type of professional wrestling match

Biblical phrases